Thomas John Patrick McGuinness (born 2 December 1941) is a guitarist, songwriter, author, record and TV producer.  Born in Wimbledon, South London, who is best known as the guitarist from Manfred Mann and The Blues Band. In 1986 he wrote the book So You Want To Be a Rock and Roll Star. He studied at Wimbledon College.

Career
Following a stint in the short-lived Roosters with Eric Clapton, McGuinness joined the 1960s group Manfred Mann as a bassist, performing in a line-up with Paul Jones. As the band sought to transform itself from jazz into a rhythm-and-blues-orientated group, he took over bass duties from Dave Richmond and received joint songwriting credits on the group's early hits. Explaining how he came into the group, McGuinness said, "They had a great bass guitarist, but he was into Charles Mingus and things like that, which the whole band was. But he refused to play simple bass lines that would fit Bo Diddley numbers. He'd play incredible 3/4 lines and things like that. So I came in and I had the overwhelming advantage of not really being able to play the bass guitar, so I played simple." Appointed the writer of album sleeve notes, he took the opportunity to identify himself as "the nastiest in the group".

When Mike Vickers and then Paul Jones left the band, McGuinness started to take the role of guitarist; Jack Bruce then played bass until replaced by Klaus Voormann. McGuinness' National Steel guitar became an important part of the group's sound, and featured on hits such as "Pretty Flamingo". He composed a few album tracks for the group, notably "L.S.D." (from Mann Made), "One Way", and "Cubist Town" (from Mighty Garvey!).

After Manfred Mann disbanded in 1969, he formed McGuinness Flint with Hughie Flint, which disbanded in 1975. Later he joined Paul Jones and Gary Fletcher in The Blues Band, and in 2016 was still appearing in the band's line-up. McGuinness also performs with The Manfreds, a splinter group from Manfred Mann, formed from the line up in the 1960s Manfred Mann band, but without Mann.

Politics 
He came out in support of the Labour Party in the 2010 General Election, whilst on tour he supported the candidacy of Bob Blizzard. Blizzard was at that time the sitting Labour MP for Waveney, but failed to be re-elected either on that occasion or in 2015.

See also
List of bass guitarists
List of British blues musicians

References

External links
Lowestoftjournal.co.uk

1941 births
Living people
English songwriters
English rock guitarists
English rock bass guitarists
Male bass guitarists
English record producers
English television producers
People from Wimbledon, London
English people of Irish descent
Manfred Mann members
British rhythm and blues boom musicians
Alumni of Wimbledon College of Arts
English blues guitarists
The Manfreds members
The Blues Band members
McGuinness Flint members